Mirificarma flavella is a moth of the family Gelechiidae. It is found in Spain, France, Corsica, Italy, Sardinia, Sicily, Serbia and Montenegro, Greece, Crete, Cyprus, Algeria and Tunisia.

The wingspan is 7–9 mm for males and 7.5–9 mm for females. The head is yellowish. The forewings have alternating transverse zig-zag patches of yellowish colour and deep yellow-tinged brown. Adults have been recorded from April to July.

The larvae feed on Trifolium pratense and Lotus corniculatus. Larvae can be found in May and June.

References

Moths described in 1844
Mirificarma
Moths of Europe
Moths of Africa